The WRU Challenge Cup (currently known as the Specsavers Cup due to sponsorship), or its full name of the Welsh Rugby Union Challenge Cup, is Wales' premier knockout rugby union competition and is organised by the Welsh Rugby Union.

On 26 February 2007, the WRU agreed a new £1 million three-year sponsorship deal with SWALEC, who had previously sponsored the event from the 1992–93 season until the 1998–99 season; the Cup will again become the SWALEC Cup. The SWALEC Cup is a three tier competition with Cup, Plate and Bowl winners. In the inaugural year the SWALEC Plate was competed for by clubs who are knocked out of the SWALEC Cup in the first two rounds, while the SWALEC Bowl was competed for by clubs who are knocked out of the first round of the plate competition. In its second year of the WRU split the three competitions directly with teams from Division 4–6 competing for the Bowl, teams from Division 2–3 competing for the Plate and teams from the Premiership and Division 1 competing for the Cup.

The current champions are Cardiff who defeated Merthyr 25–19 at the Principality Stadium on 28 April 2019.

Past winners

Total finals by club

See also
 Welsh Premier Division
 Welsh Rugby Union
 Rugby union in Wales
 Konica Minolta

References

External links
 SWALEC Cup website
 Konica Minolta Cup: A Brief History 

 
Rugby union competitions in Wales
Wales